This article is a list of awards and nominations received by Shia LaBeouf. LaBeouf is an American actor, performance artist, and filmmaker.

He has received various accolades including a BAFTA Award and a Daytime Emmy Award. He has also received nominations for two Independent Spirit Awards and a Screen Actors Guild Award. He directed the short film Let's Love Hate (2004) and later a short film titled Maniac (2011), starring American rappers Cage and Kid Cudi. Since 2014, LaBeouf has pursued a variety of public performance art projects with LaBeouf, Rönkkö & Turner.

He first gained prominence for his role as Louis Stevens in the Disney Channel series Even Stevens (2000-2003). For his performance he received the Daytime Emmy Award for Outstanding Performer in Children's Programming in 2003. He received nine Teen Choice Award nominations, winning four times for Disturbia (2007), Indiana Jones and the Kingdom of the Crystal Skull (2008), and Transformers: Revenge of the Fallen (2009).

In 2008 he received the BAFTA Rising Star Award at the 61st British Academy Film Awards. He also received a Screen Actors Guild Award for Outstanding Performance by a Cast in a Motion Picture nomination for Bobby (2006). He also received two Independent Spirit Award for Best Supporting Male nominations for his performances in American Honey (2016), and Honey Boy (2019).

Awards and nominations

References 

LaBeouf, Shia